Luanzhou, formerly Luan County, is a county-level city in the east of Hebei province, China. It is under the administration of the Tangshan city.

Administrative divisions
Subdistricts:
Luanhe Subdistrict, Gucheng Subdistrict, Luancheng Subdistrict, Xiangtang Subdistrict
Towns:
Dong'angezhuang, Leizhuang, Ciyutuo, Zhenzi, Yangliuzhuang, Youzha, Guma, Xiaomazhuang, Jiubaihu, Wangdianzi

Climate

References

External links
 
Official website of Luan County government

County-level cities in Hebei
Tangshan